James Stannage (born 22 February 1950) is an English late night talk show radio host. He presented The Late Night James Stannage Talk Show on Manchester's Key 103 until being dismissed in June 2005 after numerous warnings and a history of run-ins with regulator OFCOM. He now hosts an online radio show.

Early career
Stannage originally started out as an amateur actor and secondary school teacher.

Radio career
He first worked for Piccadilly Radio in the mid-1970s, presenting his own late-night phone-in show. Occasional guests on the show were Mike Harding and Jasper Carrott. He was renowned for his abrasive and aggressive style even then, so much so that the Bishop of Salford publicly condemned him as a bad influence.

After leaving Piccadilly Radio, he went on to work for other local radio stations such as TFM Radio during the 1980s before returning to Piccadilly 1152 in 1989. In the early days of his second stint at Piccadilly, his style was mellower than it had been before, but as time wore on became increasingly aggressive again and insulting comments to callers were stoked up as well.

The James Stannage Show
His show was in the format of a phone-in where callers could discuss anything they wanted, from sport, religion, current affairs or politics. Stannage would often argue his case severely (which were usually anti-politics and anti-religion) if he disagreed with callers. Stannage was a well known fellow around Manchester as a result of his Key 103 talk show. In many surveys, Stannage came out as the number one Manchester DJ.

Rivals
Stannage had a long-standing rivalry with Radio City talk show presenter, Pete Price. Infrequently, each would 'slag' the other off on their respective shows, and upon Stannage's sacking, Price posted on his forum a topic entitled "James Stannage Sacked"

Fines
On 24 November 2005, Emap Radio Group, owners of Key 103 received a fine of £125,000 (then a record for UK radio) after reading out comments and jokes submitted by a listener about the death of Ken Bigley (just two days after his death was confirmed) in October and November 2004.

Key 103 received several fines during Stannage's 20-year career on the station, formerly Piccadilly Radio. One outburst cost £15,000 and in 2001, Stannage came under fire for describing First World War soldiers as "thick and ignorant" and he was questioned by police in the same year over allegations that he made a racist remark on his show. In May 2004, he got into trouble because of his jokes in the aftermath of the death of Chinese cockle pickers in Morecambe Bay.

Manchester Radio Online 
Following his sacking James Stannage was one of the presenters on the online radio station ManchesterRadioOnline.com.

Miscellaneous
Comedian Jasper Carrott's album Jasper Carrott Live at Drury Lane features a routine about James Stannage.

Personal life
Stannage has two grown up sons, and two grandchildren. His elder son Darren Stannage is a sports journalist (currently working for Sky News Radio) while his younger son Dominic Stannage is a member of Manchester rock band Hiatus. Both Darren and Dominic also work for NK Theatre Arts at the Forum Theatre in Stockport. His best friend is Sean Gallagher.

References

External links
 Official Ofcom Adjudication (24 November 2005)
 James's tribute myspace page with audio.
 James's official myspace page.
 Manchester Radio Online
 A selection of James Stannage airchecks.

British DJs
British radio DJs
Living people
1950 births